Spur 364 is a state highway spur in Smith County, Texas, United States.

Route description
Spur 364's western terminus is at  SH 31. The route travels southeast and east through unincorporated Smith County before ending at  Loop 323 just within the Tyler city limits.

Spur 364 serves as a reliever route for commuters and previously served truck traffic for the now-closed Goodyear tire manufacturing plant, which was located at the route's western terminus at SH 31.

History
Spur 364 was designated along its current route on June 26, 1962.

Major intersections

References

364
Transportation in Smith County, Texas